Kapıkaya can refer to:

 Kapıkaya, Amasya
 Kapıkaya Canyon
 Kapıkaya Dam
 Kapıkaya, İliç
 Kapıkaya, Karaisalı
 Kapıkaya, Kozan